Insurance companies in Nepal are regulated by Nepal Beema Pradhikaran (Nepal Insurance Authority), an arm of Nepal Government's Ministry of Finance. As of January 2023, a total of 38 insurance companies are offering Life, Non-Life (General) and Re-insurance services.

Life insurance companies 
As of January 2023, 18 life insurance companies are in operation in Nepal:

Due to the new paid-up capital requirement of NRs.5 Arba (NRs. 5 Billion), some companies are undergoing mergers. Companies currently under the merger process are:

 Reliance and Sanima Life Insurance,  
 Prabhu and Mahalaxmi Life Insurance,  
 Union, Prime and Gurans Life Insurance.

Similarly, Surya Life Insurance Company Limited and Jyoti Life Insurance Company Limited merged to form SuryaJyoti Life Insurance Company Limited.

Non-life insurance companies 
As of March 13 2023, 16 non-life insurance are operating in Nepal:

Due to the new paid-up capital requirement of NRs.2.5 Arba (NRs. 2.5 Billion), some companies are undergoing mergers. Companies currently under the merger process are:

 Ajod and United Insurance.
 IME General and Prudential Insurance.

Similarly, Himalayan Insurance Company Limited and Everest Insurance Company Limited merged to form Himalayan Everest Insurance Company Limited. Sanima Insurance Company Limited and General Insurance Company Limited merged to form Sanima GIC Insurance Company. Siddhartha Insurance Limited and Premier Insurance Company Limited (Nepal) merged to form Siddhartha Premier Insurance Limited. Sagarmatha and Lumbini Insurance Company Limited merged to form Sagarmatha Lumbini Insurance Company Limited.

Reinsurance companies 
As of January 2023, 2 reinsurance are operating in Nepal:

References

External links
 Insurance Regulatory Authority of Nepal
 Notices of Insurance Companies of Nepal
 List of insurance Companies in Nepal

Insurance
 
insurance